The Beasley Mounds Site (40SM43) (also known as the Dixon Springs Mound Site) is a Mississippian culture archaeological site located at the confluence of Dixon Creek and the Cumberland River near the unincorporated community of Dixon Springs in Smith County, Tennessee. The site was first excavated by amateur archaeologists in the 1890s. More examples of Mississippian stone statuary have been found at the site than any other in the Middle Tennessee area. The site was listed on the National Register of Historic Places in 2010.

Site
The site was surrounded by a low embankment with regular rises thought to have once been a wooden defensive palisade with bastions. Located outside the palisade on a steep bluff overlooking the Cumberland were two small stone mounds, similar to ones found at the Castalian Springs and Sellars Mound sites. In this area several large stone box graves and mortuary caves have also been found.

Excavations
The site was excavated in 1895 by Sam Stone Bush, an amateur archaeologist and friend of William E. Myer. Myer supplied the only description of the site from this period, important now because much of the site has been leveled and farmed extensively since then.  no modern excavations have taken place at the site, making it one of the most poorly studied burial centers in the Middle Cumberland Valley.

Important finds
Bush's excavations at the site produced stone pipes, stone discoidals used for the game of chunkey and numerous examples of Mississippian culture pottery specific to the Nashville Basin area. This pottery, Matthew Incised var. Matthews, gives a rough chronology for the sites occupation as belonging to the 14th century up to the early 15th century. In 1898 a farmer plowing fields on the site discovered five stone statues and the fragment of the head of another all within a  area just  from the main platform mound. This area is theorized by archaeologists to have been the location of a large civic or mortuary structure. All of the statues and fragments were later acquired by Myers. Another statue, number 7, was also plowed from the same location at some time prior to 1923, which Myer also subsequently acquired. After his death Myers widow sold four of the statues to the Bureau of American Ethnology in 1927 and are now part of the collection of the Smithsonian Institution. This is the largest collection of Mississippian stone statues found in the Middle Tennessee area.

References

External links
 Collection of the Smithsonian-Stone Image (human form)

Middle Mississippian culture
Mounds in Tennessee
Geography of Smith County, Tennessee
Archaeological sites in Tennessee